is a Japanese jidaigeki or period drama that was broadcast in prime-time in 1973. It is based on Eiji Yoshikawa's novel of the same title. The lead star is Takashi Yamaguchi.

Plot
The drama depicts the story chronicles the life of Toyotomi Hideyoshi and the people around him.

Cast

Takashi Yamaguchi as Toyotomi Hideyoshi
 Estushi Takahashi as Oda Nobunaga
 Jin Nakayama as Akechi Mitsuhide
Masakazu Tamura as Takenaka Hanbei
Yoko Yamamoto as Kōdai-in
Masahiko Tsugawa as Asai Nagamasa
Kawarazaki Choichiro as Tokugawa Ieyasu
Hajime Hana as Hachisuka Masakatsu
Asao Koike as Shibata Katsuie
Atsushi Watanabe as Watanabe Tenzo
Hiroko Fuji as Oichi
Sadako Sawamura as Ōmandokoro
Yutaka Mizutani as Akechi Hidemitsu
Kantarō Suga as Ashikaga Yoshiaki
Akihiko Hirata as Hosokawa Fujitaka
Joe Shishido as Nakagawa Kiyohide
Juzo Itami as Araki Murashige
Keizo Kanie as Katō Kiyomasa
Daijiro Harada as Fukushima Masanori
Nobuo Kaneko as Ankokuji Ekei
Shinjirō Ehara as Takeda Katsuyori
Goro Mutsumi as Hatano Hideharu
Ryunosuke Kaneda as Saito Toshimitsu
Sachio Sakai as Matsunaga Hisahide
Kohji Moritsugu as Amago Katsuhisa
Isao Natsuyagi as Yamanaka Yukimori
Ryūtarō Ōtomo as Shimizu Muneharu
Tomisaburo Wakayama as Torii Suneemon

References

1973 Japanese television series debuts
1970s drama television series
Jidaigeki television series
Television shows based on Japanese novels
Cultural depictions of Akechi Mitsuhide
Cultural depictions of Oda Nobunaga
Cultural depictions of Tokugawa Ieyasu
Cultural depictions of Toyotomi Hideyoshi
Television series set in the 16th century